Antigone (minor planet designation: 129 Antigone) is a large main-belt asteroid. Radar observations indicate that it is composed of almost pure nickel-iron. It and other similar asteroids probably originate from the core of a shattered Vesta-like planetesimal which had a differentiated interior. It was discovered by German-American astronomer C. H. F. Peters on February 5, 1873, and named after Antigone, the Theban princess in Greek mythology.

In 1979 a possible satellite of Antigone was suggested based on lightcurve data. A model constructed from these shows Antigone itself to be quite regularly shaped. In 1990, the asteroid was observed from the Collurania-Teramo Observatory, allowing a composite light curve to be produced that showed a rotation period of 4.9572 ± 0.0001 hours and a brightness variation of 0.34 ± 0.01 in magnitude. The ratio of the lengths of the major to minor axes for this asteroid were found to be 1.45 ±0.02.

10μ radiometric data collected from Kitt Peak in 1975 gave a diameter estimate of 114 km. Since 1985, a total of three stellar occultations by Antigone have been observed. A favorable occultation of a star on April 11, 1985, was observed from sites near Pueblo, Colorado, allowing a diameter estimate of 113.0 ± 4.2 km to be calculated.

References

External links 
 
 

000129
000129
000129
Discoveries by Christian Peters
Named minor planets
000129
18730205